Rahim Aliabadi (born 22 March 1943) is a retired Greco-Roman wrestler from Iran. He won a gold medal at the 1974 Asian Games and silver medals at the 1972 Olympics and 1969 World Championships.

References

External links
 

Olympic wrestlers of Iran
People from Ardabil
Wrestlers at the 1972 Summer Olympics
Iranian male sport wrestlers
Olympic silver medalists for Iran
Living people
Asian Games gold medalists for Iran
Olympic medalists in wrestling
Asian Games medalists in wrestling
Wrestlers at the 1974 Asian Games
World Wrestling Championships medalists
Medalists at the 1974 Asian Games
1943 births
Medalists at the 1972 Summer Olympics